Gian Carlo Muzzarelli (born 22 June 1955 in Modena) is an Italian politician.

He is a member of the Democratic Party and he served as President of the Province of Modena from 2014 to 2018. He was elected Mayor of Modena on 8 June 2014 and took office on 10 June. He has been re-elected for a second term in 2019.

See also
2014 Italian local elections
2019 Italian local elections
List of mayors of Modena

References

External links

1955 births
Living people
Mayors of Modena
Democratic Party (Italy) politicians
Presidents of the Province of Modena